Leo: A Ghost Story is a 2015 children's book written by Mac Barnett and illustrated by Christian Robinson. It is about a ghost named Leo, who has been expelled from his long-time home.
In 2017, an animated short film based on the book was released, animated by Galen Fott. It was narrated by Nicol Zanzarella.

Reception
Kirkus Reviews wrote: "Robinson creates a vintage 1950s-'60s feel, offering up a raw version of M. Sasek. Together, words and pictures construct a whimsical, delightful story that deeply respects the child. And in Jane, they create a brilliant heroine whose powers lie within her wit, her open mind, and her freedom of play."

References

2015 children's books
American picture books